The Cross River or Delta–Cross languages are a branch of the Benue–Congo language family spoken in south-easternmost Nigeria, with some speakers in south-westernmost Cameroon. The branch was first formulated by Joseph Greenberg; it is one of the few of his branches of Niger–Congo that has withstood the test of time.

Greenberg's Cross River family originally included the Bendi languages. The Bendi languages were soon seen to be very different and thus were made a separate branch of Cross River, while the other languages were united under the branch Delta–Cross. However, the inclusion of Bendi in Cross River at all is doubtful, and it has been tentatively reassigned to the Southern Bantoid family, making the terms Cross River and Delta–Cross now synonymous.

Demographics
In Nigeria, this languages are spoken in Cross River State, Akwa Ibom state, Rivers State, Bayelsa State, Ebonyi State and Benue State. The Ibibio language is also spoken in Abia State.

Languages
There are four primary branches of Cross River:
Central Delta, 8 languages, the most populous being Ogbia with 100,000 speakers
Ogoni, 5 languages, with Ogoni proper (Khana) having 200,000 speakers
Upper Cross River, 22 languages, the most populous being Lokaa with 120,000 speakers
Lower Cross River, 23 languages, the most populous being Ibibio language (3.5 million speakers)

Branches and locations
Below is a list of major Cross River branches and their primary locations (centres of diversity) in southeast Nigeria based on Blench (2019).

Internal classification
Roger Blench (2008: 4) classifies the Cross River languages as follows.
Cross River
? Bendi (Yakoro, Bendi, Alege, Bumaji, Bokyi, etc.)
Delta-Cross
Upper Cross
Core
North-South (Koring, Kukele, Kohumono, Agwagwune, etc.)
East-West (Ikom, Mbembe, Legbo, etc.)
Ukpet-Ehom
Agoi, Doko, Iyongiyong
Kiong, Korop
Lower Cross
East (Efik, Ibibio, Anaang, Efiat, etc.)
Central (Enwang, Uda)
West (Ebughu, Oro, Usakade, Obolo, etc.)
Ogoni
Eleme; Baan (Ogoi)
Gokana; Tẹẹ (Tai); Kana
Central Delta
Abuan, Odual
Kugbo, Ogbia, etc.

Although Blench (2004) tentatively included the Bendi languages as possibly being a Cross River outlier branch, the Bendi languages are generally classified as Southern Bantoid.

See also
 Cross River (Nigeria), the namesake of the language group

References

Bibliography

External links
ComparaLex, database with Cross River word lists
Journal of West African Languages: Cross River Languages

 
Benue–Congo languages